Antonia Soulez (born 1943 in Paris) is a French philosopher, musician, poet, and emerita professor of philosophy of Paris 8 St-Denis.

Life
She started teaching philosophy in Lille before relocating to Amiens. She then taught at Tunis University, Créteil, and Nancy before finally settling at the university of Paris 8 St-Denis.
She co-directed the Collège international de philosophie between 2001 and 2004.

Thought
After a thesis on Plato, she shifted towards philosophy of language and logic and Wittgenstein. She is now a specialist of the Vienna Circle and of Wittgenstein.

Publications
 Détrôner l’Être, Wittgenstein antiphilosophe ? (en réponse à Badiou). Paris : Lambert-Lucas, 2016.
 Au fil du motif, autour de Wittgenstein et la musique. Sampzon : Delatour France, 2012.
 Le projet d’une grammaire philosophique chez Platon : du Cratyle au Sophiste. Paris : PUF, 1991.

References

External links
 

1943 births
20th-century French philosophers
20th-century French women writers
21st-century French philosophers
21st-century French women writers
Continental philosophers
Living people
French musicians
French philologists
French scholars of ancient Greek philosophy
French women academics
French women philosophers
Philosophers of language
Academic staff of the University of Paris
Wittgensteinian philosophers
Writers from Paris
Date of birth missing (living people)